After Winter: Sterling Brown (1985) is a documentary about the famous Black poet Sterling Brown directed by Haile Gerima.

References

1985 films
American documentary films
Documentary films about poets
1985 documentary films
Documentary films about African Americans
African-American literature
Films directed by Haile Gerima
1980s English-language films
1980s American films